Restriction is the tenth studio album by British band Archive. It was released in January 2015 under PIAS Records.

Track listing

Charts

Weekly charts

Year-end charts

References

2015 albums
PIAS Recordings albums
Archive (band) albums